WKHZ (1460 AM) is a radio station licensed to Easton, Maryland, United States. The station is owned by Radio Broadcast Communications, Inc.

In October, 2010, the station was transferred from its former owner, First Media Radio, LLC to Radio Broadcast Communications, Inc.  The station's call letters were then changed from WEMD to WKHZ on December 30, 2010.

The station became part of the KHZTV network with stations throughout Maryland including WAMD in Harford County and WYRE in Annapolis. Considered a multimedia platform with an internet TV channel playing videos and the audio on the networked radio stations, personalities such as Tracy Hart work as VJs.

References

External links
 http://www.khztv.com/station/wkhz

Easton, Maryland
KHZ